Joseph Nicodemus McCarthy (December 25, 1881 – January 12, 1937) was a Major League Baseball catcher. In 16 career games, he had 9 hits in 39 at-bats. He batted and threw right-handed.

McCarthy was born and died in Syracuse, New York.

External links

1881 births
1937 deaths
New York Highlanders players
St. Louis Cardinals players
Major League Baseball catchers
Baseball players from Syracuse, New York
Niagara Purple Eagles baseball players
Syracuse Stars (minor league baseball) players
Scranton Miners players